Prosper Chiluya (born 2 April 1998) is a Zambian footballer who plays as a defender for Kafue Celtic.

Playing career

Kafue Celtic
Chiluya spent time with Zambian club Kafue Celtic before going on loan with Pafos FC in Cyprus in 2017.

Loan to Bethlehem Steel FC
In February 2019, Chiluya later joined United Soccer League side Bethlehem Steel on loan 2018 season. Making regular starts in the defense, Chiluya scored his first goal against Indy Eleven. The goal stood as the match winner and won the team's honor as 2018 Steel FC Goal of the Year. Chiluya made 16 total appearances for Steel FC by the conclusion to his loan at the end of the season.

References

External links 
 

1998 births
Living people
Zambian footballers
Zambian expatriate footballers
Expatriate soccer players in the United States
Expatriate footballers in Cyprus
Pafos FC players
Philadelphia Union II players
Association football defenders
Zambia youth international footballers
Sportspeople from Lusaka
2019 Africa U-23 Cup of Nations players
Zambia under-20 international footballers